Mazidpur is a village in Ranga Reddy district in Andhra Pradesh, India. It falls under Hayathnagar mandal.

References
 :te:మజ్జిద్‌పూర్

Villages in Ranga Reddy district